"Bin Laden" is a hip hop song by Immortal Technique, Mos Def and DJ Green Lantern.
  
The song appeared on mixtapes since November 2004, but was not released until the summer of 2005. The 12" vinyl single also featured a remix by the same artists, adding Chuck D of Public Enemy and KRS-One. It also features two lines by Eminem: "I don't rap for dead presidents, I'd rather see the president dead, It's never been said but I set precedents" from "We As Americans", and "Shady Records was eighty seconds away from the Towers/Them cowards fucked with the wrong building, they meant to hit ours" from "Patiently Waiting".

Music and lyrics

The song, whose lyrics argue that conspiracy theories about 9/11, such as George W. Bush and previous Republican administrations being largely responsible for the September 11, 2001 attacks, was received critically given its controversial chorus theme "Bush knocked down the towers", sampled from the song "Why?" by Jadakiss. The song first appeared on mixtapes on 9 October 2004.

Immortal Technique raps: "Bush funded al-Qaeda, and now they blame the Muslim religion, even though bin Laden was a CIA tactician, they gave him billions of dollars, and they funded his purpose, Fahrenheit 9/11, that's just scratchin' the surface." In another line, Immortal Technique raps: "And of course Saddam Hussein had chemical weapons.  We sold him that shit, after Ronald Reagan's election."

Immortal Technique explained his views on 9/11 in a 2008 interview:

Samples

 "Why" by Jadakiss
 "We As Americans" by Eminem
 "Patiently Waiting" by 50 Cent featuring Eminem

References

External links
"Bin Laden" lyrics.
Immortal Technique and DJ Green Lantern perform "Bin Laden" at Cooper Union, New York City, 2007.

2005 singles
Anti-war songs
Mos Def songs
September 11 attacks in popular culture
Immortal Technique songs